Eric Swinderman (born July 8, 1976) is an American writer, director, and producer. He was the writer and director of the independent dark comedy The Enormity of Life starring former The Walking Dead star Emily Kinney, Breckin Meyer of Clueless fame and Giselle Eisenberg (The Wolf of Wall Street, Life in Pieces).

Early life 

Swinderman was born in Dover, Ohio, and grew up in  New Philadelphia, Ohio. A graduate of Cleveland State University's School of Communication, he studied film and television production

Career 

Swinderman's first big break came while working on the set of the film Dreaming on Christmas (2005) starring Danny Trejo and Nick Mancuso.

In 2007, Swinderman wrote and directed the short film, Clean, about a man of god dealing with his inner demons. The film received positive reviews and was awarded Best Picture at the Cleveland Grindhouse Film Festival.

Swinderman followed up with The Anniversary, and award-winning short film which won the Cleveland Plain Dealer's 2009 Scary Film Competition. The film, written and directed by Swinderman, screened at the Cleveland Truly Independent Film Festival and stars Deanna Cechowski and Thom Cechowski.

In 2012, Swinderman produced Made in Cleveland, an anthology of 11 short films by multiple different Cleveland directors and stars Busy Philipps and Gillian Jacobs. The film opened in limited theatrical release to wide critical acclaim.

In 2018, Swinderman wrote and directed the independent film The Enormity of Life, starring Breckin Meyer and Emily Kinney which is an official selection in the Beverly Hills Film Festival, 2019. The film features music from Avett Brothers and Kodaline and is currently represented by Shoreline Entertainment in Los Angeles

References 
 Midwest Movie Maker, April, 2018
 Cleveland.com, May, 2018
 Scene Magazine, November, 2009
 Midwest Movie Maker Magazine, February, 2012
 Cleveland Scene Magazine, August, 2012
 Cleveland Magazine, September, 2012

External links 
 Official website

1976 births
Living people
Writers from Cleveland
American filmmakers
People from New Philadelphia, Ohio